Daniel O'Hara (born 28 September 1937) is a Scottish former professional footballer who played in the Football League for Mansfield Town.

References

1937 births
Living people
Scottish footballers
Association football forwards
English Football League players
Fauldhouse United F.C. players
Celtic F.C. players
Cork Hibernians F.C. players
Mansfield Town F.C. players
Albion Rovers F.C. players
Newmains United Community F.C. players
Armadale Thistle F.C. players